

Service during the World Wars
The 415th Regiment is a regiment of the United States Army Reserve.  Established 24 June 1921 as the 415th Infantry, part of the Organized Reserves, it was assigned to the 104th Infantry Division. The regiment was originally headquartered in Casper, Wyoming, with the 1st Battalion at Gillette, Wyoming, the 2nd Battalion at Casper, and the 3rd Battalion at Laramie, Wyoming. The primary Reserve Officers Training Corps feeder school was the University of Wyoming. The regiment was inactivated by relief of personnel on 27 December 1940. It was ordered into active service on 15 September 1942, the regiment saw service during World War II with campaign participation credit in Northern France, Rhineland, and Central Europe.

Service after the World Wars
Inactivated during post-World War II demobilization, the regiment was reactivated 12 June 1947 as part of the Organized Reserves and headquartered in Tacoma, Washington under the 104th Division. The Battalions have been realigned under the 95th Training Division and provides trained personnel to support Initial Entry Training.  Most recently, the regiment has served in support of the Global War on Terror.

Lineage 
 Constituted 24 June 1921 in the Organized Reserves as the 415th Infantry and assigned to the 104th Division (later redesignated as the 104th Infantry Division)
 Organized in January 1922 with headquarters at Casper, Wyoming
 Ordered into active military service 15 September 1942 and reorganized at Camp Adair, Oregon
 Inactivated 17 December 1945 at Camp San Luis Obispo, California
 Activated 12 June 1947 in the Organized Reserves with headquarters at Tacoma, Washington
 Reorganized and redesignated 10 June 1959 as the 415th Regiment, an element of the 104th Division (Training), with headquarters at Seattle, Washington
 Reorganized 10 January - 29 February 1968 to consist of the 1st and 2nd Battalions, elements of the 104th Division (Training)
 Reorganized 1 April 1971 to consist of the 1st, 2nd, and 3rd Battalions, elements of the 104th Division (Training)
 Reorganized 16 September 1993 to consist of the 1st, 2nd, 3rd, and 4th Battalions, elements of the 104th Division (Training)
 Reorganized 16 April 1995 to consist of the 1st, 2nd, 3rd, and 4th Battalions, elements of the 104th Division (Institutional Training)

Campaign streamers

Decorations

References

415
Military units and formations established in 1921
Infantry regiments of the United States Army in World War II